Princeton Township may refer to:

 Princeton Township, Dallas County, Arkansas, in Dallas County, Arkansas
 Princeton Township, Bureau County, Illinois
 Princeton Township, White County, Indiana
 Princeton Township, Scott County, Iowa
 Princeton Township, Mille Lacs County, Minnesota
 Princeton Township, New Jersey

Township name disambiguation pages